NCLC may refer to:

National Churchill Library and Center, a research library in Washington, D.C.
National Child Labor Committee - in the United States.
National Council of Labour Colleges, former organisation in the UK
National Caucus of Labor Committees, a political organization associated with Lyndon LaRouche
National Consumer Law Center